Marsel İlhan was the defending champion but lost in the first round to Illya Marchenko.

Marchenko won the title after defeating Stéphane Robert 7–6(7–2), 6–0 in the final.

Seeds

Draw

Finals

Top half

Bottom half

References
Main Draw
Qualifying Draw

Türk Telecom İzmir Cup - Singles
2017 Singles